Herb Jaffe (May 20, 1921 – December 7, 1991) was an independent film producer in the United States.

Biography 

He was born in Brooklyn, New York, and began his career as a literary agent, working for the likes of: Paddy Chayefsky   – Marty (1955), The Hospital (1971) and Network (1976), Reginald Rose   – Twelve Angry Men (1954), Joseph Heller   – Catch-22 (1961), Something Happened (1974) and Philip Roth   – Goodbye, Columbus (1959), Portnoy's Complaint (1969), American Pastoral (1997), The Human Stain (2001). He then took a position at United Artists, eventually becoming head of worldwide production for the studio.

He became an independent producer in 1973. He produced The Wind and the Lion (1975), starring Sean Connery and eleven other films. Some of his other films include: Who'll Stop the Rain with Nick Nolte, Jinxed! with Bette Midler, The Demon Seed with Julie Christie, Time After Time and Fright Night Part 2 with Julie Carmen. He also executive produced four films including Those Lips, Those Eyes and Motel Hell. In the 1980s, he was head of The Vista Organization (a.k.a. Vista Films), and he had set up home video branches and a distribution arm New Century/Vista Film Co., a joint venture with New Century Entertainment.

He died of cancer in Beverly Hills, California.

His son, Steven-Charles Jaffe is also a producer. His credits include Demon Seed, Time After Time and Gahan Wilson: Born Dead, Still Weird. His other sons include DJ Jaffe and Robert Jaffe, who is an actor, writer and producer.

Filmography 
The Wind and the Lion (1975) (producer)
Demon Seed (1977) (producer)
Who'll Stop the Rain (1978) (producer)
Time After Time (1979) (producer)
Motel Hell (1980) (executive producer)
Those Lips, Those Eyes (1980) (executive producer)
Jinxed! (1982) (producer)
The Lords of Discipline (1983) (producer)
Little Treasure (1985) (producer)
Fright Night (1985) (producer)
Three for the Road (1987) (producer)
Maid to Order (1987) (producer)
Dudes (1987) (producer)
Nightflyers (1987) (executive producer)
Remote Control (1988) (executive producer)
Fright Night Part 2 (1988) (producer)

References

External links

American film producers
American film studio executives
Literary agents
1921 births
1991 deaths
20th-century American businesspeople
Deaths from cancer in California
People from Brooklyn